Franz Freiherr von Zedlitz und Leipe (21 April 1876 – 29 March 1944) was a German Freiherr and sport shooter who competed in the 1912 Summer Olympics.

He won the bronze medal in the clay pigeons team event. He also competed in the Shooting at the 1912 Summer Olympics – Men's trap competition and finished 4th.

References

External links
 profile

1876 births
1944 deaths
German male sport shooters
Shooters at the 1912 Summer Olympics
Olympic shooters of Germany
Olympic bronze medalists for Germany
Franz
Barons of Germany
Olympic medalists in shooting
Medalists at the 1912 Summer Olympics
German military personnel killed in World War II